Roberto Carlos is a studio album by Brazilian pop singer Roberto Carlos. The album was first released in Portuguese and later in Spanish. The Spanish version reached #1 on the Latin Pop Albums charts along with the single, "Si El Amor Se Va", that reached #1 on the Hot Latin Tracks chart.

Portuguese track listing
 "Se Diverte E Ja Nao Pensa Em Mim"
 "Todo Mundo E Alguem"
 "Se Voce Disser Que Nao Me Ama"
 "Como As Ondas Do Mar"
 "Se O Amor Se Vai"
 "Papo De Esquina"
 "Eu Sem Voce"
 "O Que E Que Eu Faco"
 "Toda Va Filosofia"
 "Volver"

Album chart
This release reached the #1 position in Billboard Latin Pop Albums.

References

1989 albums
Roberto Carlos (singer) albums
Grammy Award for Best Latin Pop Album